Niranam Diocese is a diocese of the Malankara Orthodox Syrian Church located at Niranam, Kerala.

History
Niranam diocese is created in 1876 with 22 parishes. First Metropolitan of the diocese was Parumala Mar Gregorios who was later declared by the Holy Synod in 1947 as the saint of the church. Parumala Seminary was the first Diocesan Headquarters.

Today there are 76 parishes and 6 chapels in the diocese. St. Mary's Orthodox Church, Niranam popularly known as Niranam Valiyapally, which is believed to be established by St. Thomas the Apostle in AD 54  is a parish under the Niranam diocese. The diocese controls Karunagiri M.G.D Ashram, Balabhavan, Thiruvalla Marthamariam Mandiram Hostel and Aged Home.

The diocesan headquarters is at Bethany Aramana, Thiruvalla. Present Metropolitan is Dr. Yuhanon Mar Crysostomos.

Diocesan Metropolitan

List of Parishes

 St. Thomas Orthodox Church, Alappuzha
 St. George Orthodox Church, Anaprampal
 Mar Baselios Orthodox Church, Anicad
 St. Thomas Sleeba Orthodox Church, Anjilithanam
 St George Orthodox Church, Chengaroor
 St. George  Orthodox Valiyapally, Chennithala
 St. Mary's Orthodox Church, Chennithala South
 St. Mary's Orthodox Church, Elavumkal
 St George Orthodox Church, Erathodu Veeyapuram
 St. Thomas Orthodox Church, Eraviperoor
 St. George Orthodox Church, Kadamankulam
 St. George Orthodox Church, Kadapra Bethlehem
 St. Thomas Orthodox Church, Kadapra-Mannar
 St. Mary's Orthodox Church, Kaipatta
 St. Mary's Orthodox Church, Kallooppara
 St. Stephen's Orthodox Church, Kallooppara
 St. George Orthodox Church, Karakkal
 Sleeba Orthodox Church, Kaviyoor
 St. Mary's Orthodox Church, Kuttoor
 St. Mary's Sehion Orthodox Church, Kunnamthanam, Vallamala
 St. George Orthodox Church, Vellampoika, Kunnamthanam
 Mar Gregorios Orthodox Church, Kuttapuzha
 St. John's Orthodox Church, Mallappally Bethany
 Marthamariam Orthodox Church, Mannar
 St. Mary's Orthodox Church, Manthanam
 St. Stephen's Orthodox Church, Meethalakara
 St. Kuriakose Orthodox Church, Melpadom
 St. John's Orthodox Valiyapally, Mepral
 St. Elias Orthodox Church, Kalikavu, Mepral 
 Mar Gregorios Orthodox Church, Mundiapally
 St. Kuriakose Orthodox Church, Mundukuzhy
 St. George Orthodox Church, Muthoor
 St. George Orthodox Church, Mylamon
 St. George Orthodox Church, Nedumpram
 St. George Orthodox Church, Nedumpram Vengal
 St. Mary's Orthodox Church, Nellimoode Bethany
 St. Mary's Orthodox Church, Niranam
 St. Thomas Orthodox Church, Vadakkumbhagom, Niranam
 St. Mary's Orthodox Church, Panayampala North
 St. Stephen's Orthodox Church, Panayampala South
 St. Mary's Orthodox Church, Pandankery
 St. Peter's Sehion Orthodox Church, Parumala Seminary
 St. Thomas Orthodox Church, Parumala
 St. George Orthodox Church, Parumala
 St. Mary's Orthodox Church, Parumala
 St Peter's & Paul’s Orthodox Church, Pathicadu
 St. Thomas Orthodox Church, Pavukkara
 St. George Orthodox Church, Perumpettimon
 St. Mary's Orthodox Church, Pulikeezhu
 St John's Orthodox Church, Punnaveli 
 St. Mary's Oorsalem Orthodox Church, Puramattom
 St. Kuriakose Orthodox Church, Puramattom
 St. Mary's Orthodox Church, Thalakulam
 St. Mary's Orthodox Church, Kizhakkekara, Thalavady
 St. Stephen's Orthodox Church, Thalavady
 St. Thomas Orthodox Church, Thalavady West
 St. George Orthodox Church, Thengeli
 Baselios Mar Gregorios Orthodox Church, Thirumoolapuram
 St. Mulk Orthodox Church, Kavumbhagom, Thiruvalla
 St. George Orthodox Church, Kattappuram, Thiruvalla
 St. George Orthodox Church, Paliakkara, Thiruvalla
 St. Mary's Orthodox Church, Valanjavattom
 St Mary's Orthodox Church, Valanjavattom East
 St. George Orthodox Church, Valanjavattom West
 St. Mary's Orthodox Church, Veeyapuram
 St. George Orthodox Church, Vengal Bethany
 St. Mary's Orthodox Church, Venpala
 Mar Baselios Orthodox Church, Kudakkapathal
 Mar Yacob Burdhana Orthodox Church, Murani
 Mar Baselios Orthodox Church, Thelliyoor
 St. John's Orthodox Church, Vennikulam Bethany
 St. George Orthodox Church, Vennikulam Muthupala
 St. Behanans Orthodox Church, Vennikulam
 St. Mary's Orthodox Church, Vennikulam

References

External links
 Website of Niranam Diocese
 Website of the Malankara Orthodox Syrian Church

Malankara Orthodox Syrian Church dioceses
1876 establishments in India